The Freifechter or Federfechter (Freifechter von der Feder zum Greifenfels) were a fencing guild founded around 1570 in Prague. They were known, from early in their existence, to be skilled, rivalling the Marx brothers who for the best part of a century had held a monopoly. In 1575 they were admitted by the council of Frankfurt in spite of the Marx brothers's protests, and on 7 March 1607, they were officially recognised by Rudolf II, although they had been acknowledged to be equally capable long before.

While Freifechter means "free fencer" (c.f. "free lancer"), the reference to "feather" (Feder) in the full name of the guild is unclear, though it is believed that it was derived from the name of Saint Vitus, who is often depicted with a feather. In their Deutsches Wörterbuch, the Brothers Grimm hold it plausible that it derives from the custom of pinning feathers to one's hat or lance, but the coat of arms accorded to the brotherhood by Rudolf II displays two arms each holding a quill (schreibfeder), inducing the Grimms to speculate that the brotherhood may merely have originated as the fencing guild of the professional scribes.

Johann Fischart in Gargantua (282a) has: darumb hat allein unter den göttern Mercurius ein hütlin auf und darzu als ein guter federfechter federn drauf: "among all the gods, Mercury alone wears a hat and, as a good Federfechter, sports feathers on it". But also (188ab)  'schreib mit dinten' so sicht wie blut, 'die feder' must ihm oben schweben und solt es kosten sein junges leben: "write with ink that looks like blood, the feder (Fechtfeder, but also "quill") must sway above him, even if it should cost his young life" 

Federfechterei came to mean flashy mock-combat in general, thus, in an anonymous 1697 work called des träumenden Pasquini kluge Staatsphantasien, we read ... damit der herzog von Savoien ein spiegelfechten mit dem marechal de Catinat in Piemont anstellen, selbigem aber nicht viel weher thun solte, als wenn die Lucas- und Marcusbrüder mit ihrer federfechterei sich die köpfe ein wenig blutig schlagen und darbei den zuschauern die beutel leeren, so gut sie können: "... so that the duke of Savoy undertook a bout of sham-fencing with the marechal de Catinat in Piemont, without doing more hurt to the latter as when the brethren of Luke and Mark with their federfechterei bloody each others heads a little while emptying the pockets of the onlookers as well as they may" (p. 323).

Their original charter reportedly derives from the Duke of Mecklenburg, and part of the reason that they might have retained a high reputation (equal to the Marxbruder, despite not having their cachet) for so long was the high requirements for any fencing master in Germany to start a school.  The need for the nascent fencing master to impress the municipal council of his city to start a fencing school there might have weeded out the most unfit. Once posting his notice at the city's Rathaus, making his demonstration, and (presumably) impressing the council (by fighting a number of persons who presented themselves to fence the reviewee), he could be granted the use of an open space in which to teach.

During the existence of the Federfechter, the application process for starting a school was extremely stringent; partly because of resentment from the Marxbruder, who felt the Federfechter's existence threatened their privileges and interfered in an art that rightfully belonged to the Marxbruder. Ironically, the interference by the Marxbruder may have, in the long term, preserved the Federfechter's reputation; any master who managed to start a school with this much interference would have to be special, indeed.

The Oberhauptmänner of the Marxbruder and the Federfechter were often seen at the imperial court by the mid-16th century, and were each consulted on matters of honor.

An Eschenbachen Federfechter by the name of Hanns Schuler mentions that, at least in some cases, thick jerkins were worn by both Federfechter and Marxbruder during bouting with the dussack.

A quote from Augustin Staidt, a Federfechter: "Who despises me and my praiseworthy craft, I'll hit on the head that it resound in his heart."

Additional information can be found in the book Sechs Fechtschulen der Marxbrüder und Federfechter, by Karl Wassmannsdorff, published in Germany in 1870.

References

External links
A Brief History of Fencing

Historical European martial arts
Historical fencing